Cyril Henry Matthews (9 August 1897 – 1993) was an English footballer who played in the Football League for Barrow, Bury, Chester, Notts County and Stockport County.

References

1897 births
1993 deaths
English footballers
Association football forwards
English Football League players
Cowes Sports F.C. players
Barrow A.F.C. players
Bury F.C. players
Notts County F.C. players
Lincoln City F.C. players
Stockport County F.C. players
Chester City F.C. players
Hyde United F.C. players